The journal Studies in Applied Mathematics is published by Wiley–Blackwell on behalf of the Massachusetts Institute of Technology.

It features scholarly articles on mathematical applications in allied fields, notably computer science, mechanics, astrophysics, geophysics, biophysics and high-energy physics. 
Its pedigree came from the Journal of Mathematics and Physics which was founded by the MIT Mathematics Department in 1920. The Journal changed to its present name in 1969.

The journal was edited from 1969 by David Benney of the Department of Mathematics, Massachusetts Institute of Technology.

According to ISI Journal Citation Reports, in 2020 it ranked 26th among the 265 journals in the Applied Mathematics category.

Notes

External links
Journal Home Page
MIT Faculty Page of Dr. David Benney

Mathematics journals
Wiley-Blackwell academic journals
English-language journals
8 times per year journals